"Sayonara no Ocean" (Japanese: さよならのオーシャン; translated as "Goodbye Ocean") is the first single by Kiyotaka Sugiyama, released by VAP and Embark on May 28, 1986. The single charted at #4 on the Oricon chart, selling 203,000 copies.

Background and soundtrack appearances
At the end of 1985, Kiyotaka Sugiyama and his band, Kiyotaka Sugiyama & Omega Tribe, had broken up after the completion of their last album, First Finale. Sugiyama became a solo artist, with "Sayonara no Ocean" being his first single as a solo artist.
Sugiyama himself made his first appearance in music programs such as TBS TV series The Best Ten, Nippon TV series Uta no Top Ten, and Fuji TV series Yorunohittosutajio.
The album Beyond... includes a short version of the track called "Ocean."
It was aired as a CF song for Dydo Drinco's "DyDo Jonian Coffee," starring Sugiyama himself.
It was re-released as a 8 cm single on February 21, 1988.

Track listing

Single

Charts

Weekly charts

Year-end charts

References 

1986 debut singles
Japanese pop songs
1986 songs